Cyperus grayi, commonly known as Gray's flatsedge, is a species of sedge that is native to south eastern parts of the United States.

Description
Gray's flatsedge is a perennial herb. It grows typically in dry, sandy soil in coastal plains.

See also
List of Cyperus species

References

grayi
Plants described in 1836
Flora of Alabama
Flora of Connecticut
Flora of Delaware
Flora of Florida
Flora of Georgia (U.S. state)
Flora of Maryland
Flora of Massachusetts
Flora of New Hampshire
Flora of New Jersey
Flora of New York (state)
Flora of North Carolina
Flora of Pennsylvania
Flora of Rhode Island
Flora of South Carolina
Flora of Virginia
Taxa named by John Torrey